Flame was a dog who starred in a number of movies, notably as My Dog Shep (1946) and its sequel, the My Pal series of shorts and the Rusty series.

Filmography
My Dog Shep (1946)
Out of the Blue (1947)
For the Love of Rusty (1947)
Night Wind (1948)
Northwest Stampede (1948)
My Dog Rusty (1948)
Pal's Adventure (1948) (Short) 
Miraculous Journey (1948)
Pal's Return (1948) (short)
Shep Comes Home (1948)
Rusty Saves a Life (1949)
I Found a Dog (1949) (short)
Dog of the Wild (1949) (short)
Rusty's Birthday (1949)
Pal, Canine Detective (1950) (short)
Pal, Fugitive Dog (1950) (short)
Pal's Gallant Journey (1951) (short)
Cowboy G-Men (1952) – episode "The Golden Wolf"
The Life of Riley (1954) – episode "The Dog Watch"
''The Young and the Brave (1963)

References

External links

Dog actors